The Libertarian Party of Maine (LPME) is the Maine affiliate of the Libertarian Party.

The LPME was granted status as an affiliate of the Libertarian party in 1975 and ran its first candidate for elective office in municipal elections in Portland, Maine in 1979. The LPME has had a repeating cycle of activity and hiatus since its founding. It has been active since the 2012 election cycle, with a fully constituted State committee, securing the placement of 2012 Libertarian Party Presidential Nominee Gary Johnson onto the Maine general election ballot for the 2012 election and the endorsement of Andrew Ian Dodge the United States Senate election in Maine, 2012.

In 2015, the LPME sought to become a ballot-qualified political party by registering 5,000 or more voters into the party by December of that year. The party submitted over 6,400 registration forms to the Secretary of State. However, approximately 2,000 were found to be invalid. The party sued and, in May 2016, a judge in U.S. District Court allowed the Libertarian Party to register more voters into the party to obtain the 5,000 registrant minimum needed to receive a spot on the 2016 ballot for their presidential nominee.  It was announced that they met the threshold on July 13, 2016, allowing Presidential candidate Gary Johnson to appear on the ballot.  To maintain their status, they needed 10,000 registered Libertarians to vote in November 2016.

In November 2016, Libertarian Party (United States) Presidential candidate Gary Johnson received at least 5% of the state presidential votes. This gave the LPME official party status in the state of Maine, becoming the fourth recognized party by the state.

On 8 September 2017, Androscoggin County commissioner Zakk Maher became the LPME's first elected official when he defected from the Maine Republican Party.

After the 2018 election, the LPME lost party status as it did not receive 10,000 cumulative votes of registered Libertarians.

On December 11, 2020, the party's declaration of intent to form a recognized party was recognized by the State of Maine. To become a qualifying party and participate in primary elections, the party must have 5,000 registered voters by January 2, 2022. In order to maintain this status, the party must have 10,000 registered voters cast ballots in the November 2022 state election.

On December 14, 2020, Maine State Representative, John Andrews of House District 73, announced his intent to leave the Republican party and enroll as a Libertarian, becoming Maine's first Libertarian state legislator, although he rejoined the GOP in 2022 and will run for re-election as a Republican.

LPME state committee
As of May 7, 2022 State Convention in Westbrook, ME
 Chair: Harrison Kemp
 Vice Chair: Tyler Rowe
 Treasurer: Marco Frias
 Secretary: Kate Brooks
 North Region Representative: Bonnie Young
 Central Region Representative: Jeremy Lizzotte 
 Western Region Representative: William Sampson
 Southern Region Representative: Dane Courtois

References

External links
 Libertarian Party of Maine – official website

Maine
Political parties in Maine